Yeste may refer to:

Francisco Yeste, Spanish football midfielder
Yeste, Albacete, Spanish municipality
Yeste, Huesca, Spanish village